In mathematics, a Galois module is a G-module, with G being the Galois group of some extension of fields. The term Galois representation is frequently used when the G-module is a vector space over a field or a free module over a ring in representation theory, but can also be used as a synonym for G-module. The study of Galois modules for extensions of local or global fields and their group cohomology is an important tool in number theory.

Examples
Given a field K, the multiplicative group (Ks)× of a separable closure of K is a Galois module for the absolute Galois group. Its second cohomology group is isomorphic to the Brauer group of K (by Hilbert's theorem 90, its first cohomology group is zero).
If X is a smooth proper scheme over a field K then the ℓ-adic cohomology groups of its geometric fibre are Galois modules for the absolute Galois group of K.

Ramification theory
Let K be a valued field (with valuation denoted v) and let L/K be a finite Galois extension with Galois group G. For an extension w of v to L, let Iw denote its inertia group. A Galois module ρ : G → Aut(V) is said to be unramified if ρ(Iw) = {1}.

Galois module structure of algebraic integers
In classical algebraic number theory, let L be a Galois extension of a field K, and let G be the corresponding Galois group. Then the ring OL of algebraic integers of L can be considered as an OK[G]-module, and one can ask what its structure is. This is an arithmetic question, in that by the normal basis theorem one knows that L is a free K[G]-module of rank 1. If the same is true for the integers, that is equivalent to the existence of a normal integral basis, i.e. of α in OL such that its conjugate elements under G give a free basis for OL over OK. This is an interesting question even (perhaps especially) when K is the rational number field Q.

For example, if L = Q(), is there a normal integral basis? The answer is yes, as one sees by identifying it with Q(ζ) where

 ζ = exp(2i/3).

In fact all the subfields of the cyclotomic fields for p-th roots of unity for p a prime number have normal integral bases (over Z), as can be deduced from the theory of Gaussian periods (the Hilbert–Speiser theorem). On the other hand, the Gaussian field does not. This is an example of a necessary condition found by Emmy Noether (perhaps known earlier?). What matters here is tame ramification. In terms of the discriminant D of L, and taking still K = Q, no prime p must divide D to the power p. Then Noether's theorem states that tame ramification is necessary and sufficient for OL to be a projective module over Z[G]. It is certainly therefore necessary for it to be a free module. It leaves the question of the gap between free and projective, for which a large theory has now been built up.

A classical result, based on a result of David Hilbert, is that a tamely ramified abelian number field has a normal integral basis.  This may be seen by using the Kronecker–Weber theorem to embed the abelian field into a cyclotomic field.

Galois representations in number theory
Many objects that arise in number theory are naturally Galois representations. For example, if L is a Galois extension of a number field K, the ring of integers OL of L is a Galois module over OK for the Galois group of L/K (see Hilbert–Speiser theorem). If K is a local field, the multiplicative group of its separable closure is a module for the absolute Galois group of K and its study leads to local class field theory. For global class field theory, the union of the idele class groups of all finite separable extensions of K is used instead.

There are also Galois representations that arise from auxiliary objects and can be used to study Galois groups. An important family of examples are the ℓ-adic Tate modules of abelian varieties.

Artin representations

Let K be a number field. Emil Artin introduced a class of Galois representations of the absolute Galois group GK of K, now called Artin representations. These are the continuous finite-dimensional linear representations of GK on complex vector spaces. Artin's study of these representations led him to formulate the Artin reciprocity law and conjecture what is now called the Artin conjecture concerning the holomorphy of Artin L-functions.

Because of the incompatibility of the profinite topology on GK and the usual (Euclidean) topology on complex vector spaces, the image of an Artin representation is always finite.

ℓ-adic representations
Let ℓ be a prime number. An ℓ-adic representation of GK is a continuous group homomorphism  where M is either a finite-dimensional vector space over ℓ (the algebraic closure of the ℓ-adic numbers Qℓ) or a finitely generated ℓ-module (where ℓ is the integral closure of Zℓ in ℓ). The first examples to arise were the ℓ-adic cyclotomic character and the ℓ-adic Tate modules of abelian varieties over K. Other examples come from the Galois representations of modular forms and automorphic forms, and the Galois representations on ℓ-adic cohomology groups of algebraic varieties.

Unlike Artin representations, ℓ-adic representations can have infinite image. Via an isomorphism of ℓ with C they can be identified with bona fide Artin representations.

Mod ℓ representations

These are representations over a finite field of characteristic ℓ. They often arise as the reduction mod ℓ of an ℓ-adic representation.

Local conditions on representations

There are numerous conditions on representations given by some property of the representation restricted to a decomposition group of some prime. The terminology for these conditions is somewhat chaotic, with different authors inventing different names for the same condition and using the same name with different meanings. Some of these conditions include:

Abelian representations. This means that the image of the Galois group in the representations is abelian.
Absolutely irreducible representations. These remain irreducible over an algebraic closure of the field.
Barsotti–Tate representations. These are similar to finite flat representations. 
Crystalline representations.
de Rham representations. 
Finite flat representations. (This name is a little misleading, as they are really profinite rather than finite.) These can be constructed as a projective limit of representations of the Galois group on a finite flat group scheme.
Good representations. These are related to the representations of elliptic curves with good reduction. 
Hodge–Tate representations.
Irreducible representations. These are irreducible in the sense that the only subrepresentation is the whole space or zero. 
Minimally ramified representations. 
Modular representations. These are representations coming from a modular form, but can also refer to representations over fields of positive characteristic.
Ordinary representations. These are related to the representations of elliptic curves with ordinary (non-supersingular) reduction. More precisely, they are 2-dimensional representations that are reducible with a 1-dimensional subrepresentation, such that the inertia group acts in a certain way on the submodule and the quotient. The exact condition depends on the author; for example it might act trivially on the quotient and by the character ε on the submodule.
Potentially something representations. This means that the representations restricted to an open subgroup of finite index has some specified property. 
Reducible representations. These have a proper non-zero sub-representation.
Semistable representations. These are two dimensional representations related to the representations coming from semistable elliptic curves.
Tamely ramified representations. These are trivial on the (first) ramification group. 
Unramified representations. These are trivial on the inertia group.
Wildly ramified representations. These are non-trivial on the (first) ramification group.

Representations of the Weil group
If K is a local or global field, the theory of class formations attaches to K its Weil group WK, a continuous group homomorphism , and an isomorphism of topological groups

However, WK can have strictly more representations than GK. For example, via rK the continuous complex characters of WK are in bijection with those of CK. Thus, the absolute value character on CK yields a character of WK whose image is infinite and therefore is not a character of GK (as all such have finite image).

An ℓ-adic representation of WK is defined in the same way as for GK. These arise naturally from geometry: if X is a smooth projective variety over K, then the ℓ-adic cohomology of the geometric fibre of X is an ℓ-adic representation of GK which, via φ, induces an ℓ-adic representation of WK. If K is a local field of residue characteristic p ≠ ℓ, then it is simpler to study the so-called Weil–Deligne representations of WK.

Weil–Deligne representations
Let K be a local field. Let E be a field of characteristic zero. A Weil–Deligne representation over E of WK (or simply of K) is a pair (r, N) consisting of
 a continuous group homomorphism , where V is a finite-dimensional vector space over E equipped with the discrete topology,
 a nilpotent endomorphism  such that r(w)Nr(w)−1= ||w||N for all w ∈ WK.
These representations are the same as the representations over E of the Weil–Deligne group of K.

If the residue characteristic of K is different from ℓ, Grothendieck's ℓ-adic monodromy theorem sets up a bijection between ℓ-adic representations of WK (over ℓ) and Weil–Deligne representations of WK over ℓ (or equivalently over C). These latter have the nice feature that the continuity of r is only with respect to the discrete topology on V, thus making the situation more algebraic in flavor.

See also
Compatible system of ℓ-adic representations

Notes

References

Further reading
 
 

Algebraic number theory
Galois theory